Henry Borlase (ca. 1590 – ca. 1624) was an English politician who sat in the House of Commons between 1621 and 1624.

Borlase was the son of William Borlase of Marlow and Bockmore Buckinghamshire. He matriculated at Magdalen College, Oxford, on 22 June 1604, aged 13. He was a student of the Middle Temple in 1607. In 1621, he was elected Member of Parliament for Aylesbury. In 1624 he was elected MP for Marlow until his death.    His father founded Sir William Borlase's Grammar School  in his memory.

References

Alumni of Magdalen College, Oxford
Members of the Middle Temple
1590s births
1624 deaths
English MPs 1621–1622
English MPs 1624–1625